The following is a list of all team-to-team transactions that have occurred in the National Hockey League during the 1969–70 NHL season. It lists what team each player has been traded to, signed by, or claimed by, and for which player(s) or draft pick(s), if applicable.

Trades

May

 Trade completed on May 7, 1969.

June

September

October

November

December

January

February

March

 Trade completed on May 14, 1970.

Additional sources
 hockeydb.com - search for player and select "show trades"
 

Transactions
National Hockey League transactions